Amy Mainzer (born January 2, 1974) is an American astronomer, specializing in astrophysical instrumentation and infrared astronomy. She is the Deputy Project Scientist for the Wide-field Infrared Survey Explorer and the Principal Investigator for the NEOWISE project to study minor planets and the Near Earth Object Surveyor space telescope mission.

Life 

Mainzer received a B.Sc. in Physics from Stanford University with honors (1996), an M.Sc. in Astronomy from California Institute of Technology (2000), and a Ph.D. in Astronomy from the University of California, Los Angeles (2003).

Her research interests include asteroids, brown dwarfs, planetary atmospheres, debris disks, star formation, and the design and construction of new ground- and space-based instrumentation.

She appears in several episodes of the History Channel series The Universe. She also appears in the documentary featurette "Stellar Cartography: On Earth" included on the Star Trek Generations home video release (March 2010). Mainzer is also in the 2016 documentary about the life of Leonard Nimoy and the effect of Spock on popular culture called "For the Love of Spock", which was directed by Leonard Nimoy's son Adam Nimoy. She serves as the science consultant and host for the live-action interstitials on the PBS Kids series Ready Jet Go!. She was the science advisor for the 2021 Netflix film Don't Look Up.

Awards and honors 

 NASA Exceptional Scientific Achievement Medal (2012)
 NASA Exceptional Achievement Medal (2011)
 Numerous group achievement awards for Spitzer, WISE, NEOWISE
 Lew Allen Award for Excellence (2010)
 NASA Graduate Student Research Program Fellowship (2001–2003) 
 National Science Foundation Graduate Research Fellowship (1996–1999)

Asteroid 

Asteroid 234750 Amymainzer, discovered by astronomers of the NEAT program at Palomar Observatory in 2002, was named after her. The official  was published by the Minor Planet Center on 26 July 2010.

Asteroid 251627 Joyceearl was named after her grandparents.

See also 
List of women in leadership positions on astronomical instrumentation projects

References

External links 

 
 Amy Mainzer at the Lunar and Planetary Laboratory
 

Living people
American women astronomers
1974 births
California Institute of Technology alumni
Stanford University alumni
University of California, Los Angeles alumni
Jet Propulsion Laboratory
University of Arizona
Women planetary scientists
Planetary scientists